Daniel Lewis (born 8 November 1989) is an international track and field athlete, competing for both England and Jamaica in the Triple Jump. 
He competed at the 2014 Commonwealth Games where he finished in 7th place with a leap of 16.17m.

As a youth he competed at the English Schools' Athletics Championships in both the long jump and triple jump becoming a 4-time medalist and 2-time Champion
As a senior he received his first England call up in 2014 and again in 2016

Personal best(s)

 Triple Jump (indoor): 16.31m (Sheffield, U.K)
 Triple Jump (outdoor): 16.26m (Bilbao, Spain)

International competitions

National competitions

References 

1989 births
Living people
English male triple jumpers
International sports competitions in Glasgow
2014 Commonwealth Games
Commonwealth Games in the United Kingdom
Athletes from London
Athletes (track and field) at the 2014 Commonwealth Games
Commonwealth Games competitors for Jamaica